Mazen Moutan Al-Yassin (born 8 July 1996) is a Saudi Arabian sprinter specialising in the 400 metres. He won a silver medal at the 2017 Asian Indoor and Martial Arts Games. With the time of 46.35 he is the current Saudi indoor national record holder.

International competitions

1Disqualified in the final

Personal bests
Outdoor
200 metres – 21.58 (+0.3 m/s, Palembang 2013)
400 metres – 45.28 (Tashkent 2019)
Indoor
400 metres – 46.35 (Ashgabat 2017) NR

External links

References

1996 births
Living people
Saudi Arabian male sprinters
Islamic Solidarity Games competitors for Saudi Arabia
Athletes (track and field) at the 2020 Summer Olympics
Olympic athletes of Saudi Arabia
21st-century Saudi Arabian people